Adams Township is one of the twenty-two townships of Coshocton County, Ohio, United States. As of the 2010 census the population was 790.

Geography
Located in the far eastern part of the county, it borders the following townships:
Bucks Township, Tuscarawas County - north
Jefferson Township, Tuscarawas County - northeast corner
Salem Township, Tuscarawas County - east
Oxford Township, Tuscarawas County - southeast corner
Oxford Township - south
Lafayette Township - southwest corner
White Eyes Township - west
Crawford Township - northwest corner

No municipalities are located in Adams Township, although the unincorporated community of Bakersville lies in the northeastern part of the township.

Name and history
The Township was organized in 1832. It is one of ten Adams Townships statewide.

Government
The township is governed by a three-member board of trustees, who are elected in November of odd-numbered years to a four-year term beginning on the following January 1. Two are elected in the year after the presidential election and one is elected in the year before it. There is also an elected township fiscal officer, who serves a four-year term beginning on April 1 of the year after the election, which is held in November of the year before the presidential election. Vacancies in the fiscal officership or on the board of trustees are filled by the remaining trustees.

References

External links
County website 

Townships in Coshocton County, Ohio
1832 establishments in Ohio
Populated places established in 1832
Townships in Ohio